

Helmuth Prieß (6 March 1896 – 21 October 1944) was a general in the Wehrmacht of Nazi Germany during World War II who commanded the XXVII Army Corps. He was a recipient of the Knight's Cross of the Iron Cross. Prieß was killed on 21 October 1944 in Hasenrode, East Prussia.

Awards and decorations

 Knight's Cross of the Iron Cross on 7 March 1944 as Generalleutnant and commander of 121. Infanterie-Division

References

Citations

Bibliography

 

1896 births
1944 deaths
German Army personnel of World War I
German Army personnel killed in World War II
Recipients of the Gold German Cross
Recipients of the Knight's Cross of the Iron Cross
People from Hildesheim
German Army generals of World War II
Generals of Infantry (Wehrmacht)
People from the Province of Hanover
Reichswehr personnel
Military personnel from Lower Saxony